Dictymia is a small genus of ferns. They are found growing on rocks, or hanging from branches in Malesia, Australia and islands of the Pacific Ocean.  Species include Dictymia mckeei, and Dictymia brownii. The word Dictymia is from the ancient Greek language. It refers to the "net" like veiny patterns.

References

Polypodiaceae
Fern genera